Tim Mackintosh-Smith (born 17 July 1961) is a British, Yemen-based, Oxford-educated Arabist, writer, traveller and lecturer. He has written numerous books on the Middle East, won several awards and has presented a major BBC television series.

Education
Mackintosh-Smith was educated at Clifton College, a boarding independent school for boys in the suburb of Clifton in the port city of Bristol in South West England, from 1971 to 1978, followed by a musical scholarship to the University of Oxford, where he read Classical Arabic.

Life and career
From 1982 to 2019, Mackintosh-Smith lived in an ancient tower house off the "Market of the Cows" in the old city of San'a, Yemen. As a consequence of the civil war in Yemen, he had to leave this home and temporarily relocate to Malaysia. He is the author of the travel books Yemen: Travels in Dictionaryland (1997) and Yemen: The Unknown Arabia (2000). Further, he is one of the foremost scholars of the Moroccan medieval scholar Ibn Battuta. Mackintosh-Smith has published a trilogy recounting Ibn Battuta's journeys as published in his Muqaddimah (The Prologue): Travels with a Tangerine (2001), The Hall of a Thousand Columns (2005) and Landfalls (2010). He has additionally written widely on subjects as broad as alabaster, the collection of frankincense, the stories of M.R. James and the history of umbrellas.

Mackintosh-Smith presented a major BBC documentary series Travels with a Tangerine (2007), recounting his experiences tracing Ibn Battutah's fourteenth-century travels in the present day. He was featured in a documentary film The English Sheik and the Yemeni Gentleman.

Mackintosh-Smith has won several awards. Yemen: Travels in Dictionary Land, won the 1998 Thomas Cook Travel Book Award. The Daily Telegraph has described him as "the sage of Sana'a." He has also written about the history of the Arab people and their cultures in his Arabs: A 3,000-Year History of Peoples, Tribes and Empires (2019). In this "history of Arabs", avoiding the general notion of 'the Arabs', he dedicated an important part of the 630 pages to the pre-Islamic times of documented Arab history, that is the 1,400 years before Muhammad, and discussed the influence this long period brought about for the  following 1,400 years of Arab history since then. Attributing less importance to the concept of Arabs as an homogeneous and discrete ethnic group, he stressed the importance of the Arabic language as "the strongest link" in Arab history and present.

References

External links

Mackintosh-Smith's official website
 Travels with a Tangerine: A Journey in the Footnotes of Ibn Battutah —John Murray, 2003. first part of trilogy following the footsteps of Ibn Battutah by Tim Mackintosh-Smith.
 The Hall of a Thousand Columns: Hindustan to Malabar with Ibn Battutah —John Murray, 2005. second part of trilogy by Tim Mackintosh-Smith.
 Landfalls: on the Edge of Islam with Ibn Battutah —John Murray, 2010. final part of trilogy by Tim Mackintosh-Smith.
 Moonglow from Underground — Saudi Aramco World article by Tim Mackintosh-Smith (May/June 1999).
 A Tangerine in Delhi — Saudi Aramco World article by Tim Mackintosh-Smith (March/April 2006).
Travels with Ibn Battutah, interview with Tim Mackintosh-Smith in www.theglobaldispatches.com

1961 births
Living people
English travel writers